Herbert Cassidy (25 July 1935 – 10 April 2013) was Dean of Armagh from 1989 to 2006.

Herbert was educated at Cork Grammar School and Trinity College, Dublin. He was ordained in 1958. After  curacies in Belfast and Derry he held incumbencies at Aghavilly (1962–1965) and Portadown (1965–1985). He was Dean of Kilmore from 1985 to 1989.

References

1935 births
People from County Cork
People educated at Cork Grammar School
Alumni of Trinity College, Cambridge
Deans of Armagh
Deans of Kilmore
20th-century Irish Anglican priests
21st-century Irish Anglican priests
2013 deaths